Aknīste Parish is an administrative unit of Jēkabpils Municipality in the Selonia region of Latvia. It was created in 2010 from the countryside territory of Aknīste town. At the beginning of 2014, the population of the parish was 474.

Towns, villages and settlements of Aknīste parish 
 Mežaraupi
 Navicki
 Pasusēja
 Susēja
 Vilkupe

References

External links

Parishes of Latvia
Jēkabpils Municipality
Selonia